Parliamentary elections were held in the Federated States of Micronesia on 5 March 1991. All candidates for seats in Congress ran as independents.

References

Micronesia
1991 in the Federated States of Micronesia
Elections in the Federated States of Micronesia
Non-partisan elections